Shingrai Waterfall also known as Shingro Dand is a waterfall located in Shingrai Manglawar in Swat District of Khyber Pakhtunkhwa the Province of Pakistan. It is known for its high and beautiful surrounding.

Shingrai Waterfall is about 10,000 feet above sea level.

Etymology of the name
The word Shingro or Shingrai is Pashto name of a village where it is situated.

See also
 Manglawar
 Jarogo Waterfall
 List of Tourist attractions in Swat
 List of waterfalls of Pakistan

References 

Tourist attractions in Swat
Waterfalls of Pakistan
Swat District
Tourist attractions in Khyber Pakhtunkhwa